Archibald Montgomery (born 27 January 1873 – 5 January 1922) was a Scottish footballer. His regular position was as a goalkeeper. He was born in Chryston, Lanarkshire. He played for Manchester United, Rangers, and Bury.  He would also manage Albion Rovers at the end of his career.

External links
MUFCInfo profile

1873 births
1922 deaths
Scottish footballers
Manchester United F.C. players
Rangers F.C. players
Bury F.C. players
Scottish Football League managers
Association football goalkeepers
English Football League players
Footballers from North Lanarkshire
Bury F.C. managers
Albion Rovers F.C. managers
Scottish football managers